Joseph Horn Cloud born 1873 and died September 18, 1920. His father was Horn Cloud and mother Nest, both parents died at the Wounded Knee Massacre along with two brothers William Horn Cloud (1876-1890),  Sherman Horn Cloud (1865-1890) and a niece. Joseph was a survivor of the massacre as well as his brother Daniel and half brother Dewey Beard[p. 89-95]. Dewey's mother was Yellow Leaf who also died during the massacre. In the early 1900s a writer named Eli S. Ricker began research for a book he was going to call "The Final Conflict between the Red Men and the Palefaces." He gathered sources and interviews about conditions and battles on the Plains during the last half of the 1800s. He recorded the interviews in small note pads known to historians as the "Ricker Tablets." One such interview was with Joseph telling Ricker what he witnessed at the Wounded Knee Massacre, "When the shooting began the women ran to the ravine. The shooting was in every direction. Soldiers shot into one another.... Many of the Indians in the circle were killed. Many of them mingled with the soldiers behind them, picking up guns from dead soldiers and taking cartridge belts."

Shortly after the loss of much of his family, Joseph assumed his father's name 'Horn Cloud' as his surname. He assumed the name while living at Holy Rosary Mission (now Red Cloud Indian School), Pine Ridge. He converted to Catholicism and became a catechist and prominent church member. Joseph worked as a day laborer and cowboy, learned carpentry and eventually worked as a translator. Also became secretary of the Oglala Tribal Council. While at the mission school, Joseph had learned enough English to begin seeking compensation in the mid-1890s and lead a survivors' campaign for losses during 1890-1891. Legally though, claimants could not demand retribution for their dead relatives, which was limited by the 1891 act so that claimants could only seek compensation for stolen or damaged property. Both Joseph and his brother Dewey made property loss claims and sought restitution for their father's stolen property in the combined amount of approximately $4,526.50, which was during the time frame into the earliest part of the 1900s. Joseph with his spouse Mildred Beautiful Bald Eagle had two children, their daughter Jessie and William Horn Cloud.

Joseph was instrumental for interviews and accounts, speaking out against prejudice as well as leading compensation claims regarding Wounded Knee since he knew enough of the English language. He was an early vital member and a founder of the Wounded Knee Survivors Association founded in 1901 which continues today. Joseph and his brother Dewey Beard raised enough money for a monument that was erected near the mass grave in 1905.

References

1873 births
1920 deaths